Alexander Chee (born August 21, 1967) is an American fiction writer, poet, journalist and reviewer.

Born in Rhode Island, he spent his childhood in South Korea, Kauai, Truk, Guam and Maine. He attended Wesleyan University and the Iowa Writers' Workshop.

Career
Chee's short fiction appeared in the anthologies Best American Erotica 2007, A Fictional History of the US (With Huge Chunks Missing), Men on Men 2000, His 3, and his personal essays in Out, From Boys To Men, Loss Within Loss, Boys Like Us, The M Word, and The Man I Might Become. His essay "I, Reader" was selected for inclusion in the Notable Essays list of the 2011 edition of the Best American Essays, and his essay "Girl," was included in Best American Essays 2016.

His short stories and essays have also appeared in magazines and journals such as The New York Times Book Review, Tin House, Slate, Guernica, NPR. Chee's poetry has appeared in Barrow Street, LIT, Interview, the James White Review, and XXX Fruit. He has written journalism and reviews for The New York Times, Time Out New York, Out/Look, OutWeek, The Advocate, Out, Bookforum and the San Francisco Review of Books.

Chee's critically acclaimed debut novel Edinburgh was awarded the Asian American Writers Workshop Literary Award, the Lambda Editor's Choice Prize, and the Michener/Copernicus Fellowship Prize. In 2003, Out named Chee one of their 100 Most Influential People of the year.

He was also the recipient of the 2003 Whiting Award, a 2004 NEA Fellowship, and a 2010 Massachusetts Cultural Council of the Arts Fellowship, as well as residency fellowships at the MacDowell Colony, the Virginia Center for Creative Arts, Civitella Ranieri, and Leidig House. He was a judge for the PEN/Open Book award in 2012 and currently serves on the board of directors of the Authors' Guild of America.

Chee was the associate fiction editor of literary magazine The Nervous Breakdown, and is currently a contributing editor at The New Republic, an editor-at-large at VQR and The Lit Hub, and a critic-at-large for The Los Angeles Times.

He has taught fiction writing at the New School University, Wesleyan, University of Iowa Writers’ Workshop, Columbia University, the University of Texas at Austin and Princeton University, and has served as a Visiting Writer at Amherst College. In the winter semester 2012/2013 he was Picador Professor for Literature at the University of Leipzig. Chee is currently associate professor of creative nonfiction and fiction writing at Dartmouth College in Hanover, New Hampshire.

Works

Books
 2001: Edinburgh, Picador USA, 
 2016: 
 2018: How to Write an Autobiographical Novel (April 17, 2018), Mariner Books,

Anthologies

Essays and stories

Film appearances
Interview in Sex Is... (1993), Directed by Marc Huestis, as himself

Podcast appearances
LGBTQ&A, "Alexander Chee: On Becoming An American Writer," April 23, 2018

References

External links

Author's blog
Profile at The Whiting Foundation
"Korean Enough: Alexander Chee on New Korean American Fiction" by Alexander Chee, Guernica, June 14, 2008
"Future Queer" by Alexander Chee, The New Republic, June 23, 2015

American poets
Iowa Writers' Workshop alumni
American gay writers
American expatriates in South Korea
Living people
Place of birth missing (living people)
Wesleyan University alumni
American male journalists
American LGBT poets
LGBT people from Rhode Island
Writers from Rhode Island
American male poets
American LGBT people of Asian descent
1967 births
American male non-fiction writers
21st-century American poets
21st-century American male writers
21st-century American LGBT people
Gay poets